The 1975 Monte Carlo Rally was the 43rd Rallye Automobile de Monte-Carlo. It was won by Sandro Munari.

Entry list

Results

References

External links 

Monte Carlo Rally
1975 in French motorsport
1975 in Monégasque sport
1975 World Rally Championship season